János Krizmanich (6 December 1880 – 26 July 1944) was a Hungarian gymnast who competed in the 1912 Summer Olympics.

He was part of the Hungarian team, which won the silver medal in the gymnastics men's team, European system event in 1912. In the individual all-around competition he finished 19th.

References

External links
profile
profile 

1880 births
1944 deaths
People from Sopron
Hungarian male artistic gymnasts
Gymnasts at the 1912 Summer Olympics
Olympic gymnasts of Hungary
Olympic silver medalists for Hungary
Olympic medalists in gymnastics
Medalists at the 1912 Summer Olympics
Sportspeople from Győr-Moson-Sopron County